Josh Tanner is an American politician serving as a member of the Idaho House of Representatives for the 14B district. He assumed office on December 1, 2022.

Early life and education 
Tanner was raised in the Treasure Valley region. He earned a Bachelor of Science and Executive MBA from Boise State University.

Career 
Tanner operates a small business and served as a commissioner of the Eagle Fire Protection District. He was elected to the Idaho House of Representatives in November 2022.

References 

Living people
Idaho Republicans
Members of the Idaho House of Representatives
People from Eagle, Idaho
People from Ada County, Idaho
Boise State University alumni
Year of birth missing (living people)